This list is of the Historic Sites of Japan located within the Prefecture of Hyōgo.

National Historic Sites
As of 1 January 2021, fifty-one Sites have been designated as being of national significance (including one *Special Historic Site).

|-
|}

Prefectural Historic Sites
As of 1 May 2020, ninety-seven Sites have been designated as being of prefectural importance.

Municipal Historic Sites
As of 1 May 2020, a further two hundred and thirty-eight Sites have been designated as being of municipal importance.

See also

 Cultural Properties of Japan
 Awaji, Harima, Settsu, Tajima, and Tanba Provinces
 List of Places of Scenic Beauty of Japan (Hyōgo)

References

External links
  Cultural Properties in Hyōgo Prefecture

Hyōgo Prefecture
 Hyogo